The 2002 Women's United Soccer Association season was the second season for WUSA, the top level professional women's soccer league in the United States. The regular season began on April 13 and ended on August 11.  The playoffs began on August 17, with the championship match between played on August 24 between the Carolina Courage and the Washington Freedom.

Changes from 2001 
Prior to the season the Bay Area CyberRays, the champions in the previous season, changed their name to the San Jose CyberRays

All-Star Game 

The WUSA All-Star game was played for the first time after the completion of the 2002 season, with the South squad defeating the North 6–1 in front of 14,208 spectators at PGE Park in Portland, Oregon.  Rookie Abby Wambach of the Washington Freedom was awarded the game MVP after scoring twice.

Competition format
The regular season began on April 13 and ended on August 11.
Each team played a total of 21 games, three against each opponent (either twice at home and once away or vice versa).  This caused an uneven schedule with teams hosting either 10 or 11 home games each.
The four teams with the most points from the regular season qualified for the playoffs. The regular season champions and runners-up hosted the fourth- and third-placed teams, respectively, in the single-game semifinals on August 17.  The winners of the semifinals met at Herndon Stadium for the final on August 24.

Standings

Playoffs

Semi-finals

Founders Cup II

Awards

Source:

Statistical leaders

Top scorers

Top assists

|}

See also

 List of WUSA drafts

References

External links
 WUSA Website (archive.org)
 WUSA on Fun While It Lasted

 
2002
2001–02 domestic women's association football leagues
2002–03 domestic women's association football leagues
1
2002 in American soccer leagues